Guy Thorne was the pen name of Cyril Arthur Edward Ranger Gull (1875 – 9 January 1923), a prolific English journalist and novelist best known for his novel When It Was Dark: The Story of A Great Conspiracy (1903). He also wrote under the names C. Ranger Gull and Leonard Cresswell Ingleby.

Life and works
Thorne was educated at Denstone College, Manchester Grammar, and Oxford University, although he left without taking a degree. He was on the literary staff of the Saturday Review 1897–98, writing also for The Bookman and The Academy. He was editor of London Life in 1899, then joined the Daily Mail and later the Daily Express. He also wrote for the gossip weekly Society.

His first novel was The Hypocrite: A Novel of Oxford and London Life, published anonymously in 1898. From 1900, he was engaged in writing fiction, producing about 125 novels in the succeeding years. The most famous was When It Was Dark, which reached sales of 500,000 copies. The book describes the attempt by a Jew, the malevolent Constantine Schaube, to overthrow the whole of the Christian world by fraudulently disproving the Resurrection.

After its publication, the Bishop of London preached about When It Was Dark at Westminster Abbey. Calling it  "a remarkable work of fiction"  he said it depicts how the world would be if the Resurrection were proved to be a gigantic fraud. ". . .you feel the darkness creeping round the world, you see . . . crime and violence increase in every part of the world. When you see how darkness settles down upon the human spirit, regarding the Christian record as a fable, then you quit with something like adequate thanksgiving, and thank God it is light because of the awful darkness when it was dark."

When It Was Dark has been criticised for its stereotyping of Jews and their portrayal as intent on destroying what Thorne viewed as the most valuable element of British life – the Christian faith and the spiritual values associated with it. Other critics have also labelled the book as anti-Semitic.

A sequel When It Was Light (1906), often attributed to Gull, was probably written by George Reginald Bacchus.

Thorne was a prolific author of horror and mystery novels which sometimes have a redeeming bizarreness. His novels include:  Made in His Image (1906), The Soul-Stealer (1906), The Angel (1908), Not in Israel (dedicated to Cecil Broadhurst, 1913), And it Came to Pass (1915), The Secret Sea-Plane (1915), The Enemies of England (1915), Lucky Mr Loder (1918), The Secret Monitor (1918), The Air Pirate (1919), Doris Moore (1919), The House of Danger (1920), The City in the Clouds (1921), The Love Hater (1921), The Dark Dominion (1923) and When the World Reeled (1924). He also wrote numerous essays and a biography of Frederick Nicholas Charrington (1850–1936), the English social reformer who devoted his life to Temperance work.

Thorne was a close friend of the publisher Leonard Smithers and a friend of the poet Ernest Dowson. He was known for his heavy drinking. Who's Who 1906 listed his recreations as shooting and French literature, and his address as Trink, Lelant, Cornwall.

Guy Thorne died in London on 9 January 1923.

A biography, Guy Thorne: C Ranger Gull: Edwardian Tabloid Novelist and his Unseemly Brotherhood, by David Wilkinson was published by Rivendale Press, High Wycombe in 2012.

Works
The following is a partial list of works by Guy Thorne:

 The Hypocrite 1898
 When It Was Dark: The Story of a Great Conspiracy 1904
 A Lost Cause 1905
 The Soul Stealer 1906
 The Serf ~ 1907
 "I Believe" and other essays 1907
 The Angel 1908
 The Socialist 1909
 House of Torment 1911
 The Drunkard 1912
 The Great Acceptance: The Life Story of F. N. Charrington 1913
 Chance in Chains: A Story of Monte Carlo 1914
 The Secret Service Submarine: A Story of the Present War 1915
 Rescuing Rupert  1917
 The Air Pirate 1919
  Lapse of the Bishop 1920
 The City in the Clouds  1922

 As C. Ranger-Gull 
 A Story of the Stage Portalone Retribution, reissued as a Daily Mail sixpenny novel no. 116 in 1910, illustrated by G. H. Evison. 
 The Harvest of Love Back To Lilac Land The Price of Pity'' (1905)

References

External links

 
 
 
 
 Works by Cyril Arthur Edward Ranger Gull at The Online Books Page

1875 births
1923 deaths
21st-century English novelists
English essayists
English male journalists
English mystery writers
People educated at Manchester Grammar School
People educated at Denstone College
British male essayists
English male novelists
People from Lelant
21st-century essayists
21st-century English male writers